The Louis and Mathilde Reuter House is a private limestone home in central Austin, Texas, United States, in the historic Travis Heights neighborhood. The home was built by Louis Reuter, a local entrepreneur who moved to Austin in 1918 and later opened the city's first self-service grocery store.

The home boasts an unusual U-shaped design that combines Spanish Revival and Mission Revival styling, with Palladian windows. The home was built without a precise blueprint but rather a "footprint" on the property which spared the grandiose old oak trees.
 
The home is located at 806 Rosedale Terrace. It was added to the National Register of Historic Places in 1987.

References

Houses completed in 1934
Houses in Austin, Texas
Houses on the National Register of Historic Places in Texas
Mission Revival architecture in Texas
Spanish Colonial Revival architecture in Texas
National Register of Historic Places in Austin, Texas
Recorded Texas Historic Landmarks
City of Austin Historic Landmarks
1934 establishments in Texas